Andrew Howard Warren (born 1977) is an American prosecutor and politician who was the State Attorney of Florida's 13th Judicial Circuit, Hillsborough County from 2017 to 2022. He was previously a federal prosecutor in the fraud division at the United States Department of Justice.

Early life 
Andrew Howard Warren was born in 1977 in Gainesville, Florida. He has a younger sister and two older brothers. His father, originally from Boston, moved in the 1970s to teach at the University of Florida. Warren played baseball and soccer at Eastside High School. He attended Brandeis University where he studied political science and economics. He studied abroad his junior year at the London School of Economics. Warren graduated from the Columbia Law School in 2002. He was admitted to The Florida Bar on July 10, 2003.

Career 
Warren clerked for U.S. district judge, Samuel Conti. He worked for Latham & Watkins before joining the United States Department of Justice where he worked in the fraud section under Paul Pelletier. In 2009, he helped prosecute Texas financer Allen Stanford alongside Gregg Costa and William Stellmach.

In November 2016, Democrat Warren defeated incumbent Republican prosecutor Mark Ober 50.4 to 49.5 percent to become the state attorney of Florida's 13th Judicial Circuit, Hillsborough County. He had campaigned as a progressive reformer who was focused on rehabilitation and reducing recidivism. He took office on January 3, 2017. In 2018, Warren established a convection review unit. Through working with the Innocence Project, the unit led to the exoneration of Robert DuBoise who was imprisoned for 37 years. In April 2020, he prosecuted a megachurch pastor for violating COVID-19 lockdown requirements. Warren dropped the charges after governor Ron DeSantis passed an executive order. In 2020, he was reelected by 53 percent to a second four-year term. In June 2022, he announced that he would not prosecute individuals who sought or provided abortions. In response, Governor DeSantis suspended Warren in August. County Judge Susan Lopez was appointed by DeSantis as acting state attorney. In January 2023, federal judge Robert Hinkle found that DeSantis had violated Warren's first amendment rights and the Constitution of Florida. Hinkle stated that the federal courts lacked the authority to reinstate Warren as it is a state law issue. In February 2023, Warren appealed the ruling to the United States Court of Appeals for the Eleventh Circuit.

Personal life 
Warren met Alexandra Coler on his first day at Brandeis University. They parted ways before marrying in 2006 in Philadelphia. On August 4, 2009, his wife was in a car accident while she was eight months pregnant. His son, Zack, died shortly after birth. They later had two daughters.

Electoral history

References

External links
 

Living people
1977 births
People from Gainesville, Florida
21st-century American lawyers
21st-century American politicians
State attorneys
Florida lawyers
Florida Democrats
Brandeis University alumni
Columbia Law School alumni
United States Department of Justice lawyers